Bruno Cortez Cardoso (born June 27, 1984 in São Paulo), is a Brazilian goalkeeper. He currently plays for Fort Lauderdale Strikers in the North American Soccer League.

He completed Portuguesa loan move from Palmeiras on 13 June 2011, returning to Palmeiras on 10 January 2012.

Honours

Club
Palmeiras
São Paulo State Championship: 2008
Copa do Brasil: 2012
Campeonato Brasileiro Série B: 2013

Portuguesa
Campeonato Brasileiro Série B: 2011

Individual
Copa do Brasil's Best Goalkeeper: 2012

External links
 CBF
 Guardian Stats Centre
 sambafoot
 palmeiras.globo.com

1984 births
Living people
Footballers from São Paulo (state)
Brazilian footballers
Brazilian expatriate footballers
Brazilian people of Portuguese descent
Association football goalkeepers
Campeonato Brasileiro Série A players
Campeonato Brasileiro Série B players
Sociedade Esportiva Palmeiras players
Associação Portuguesa de Desportos players
Santa Cruz Futebol Clube players
Fort Lauderdale Strikers players
Expatriate soccer players in the United States
North American Soccer League players